John Walls (25 October 1856 – 13 March 1945) was a New Zealand cricketer. He played one first-class match for Otago in 1886/87.

See also
 List of Otago representative cricketers

References

External links
 

1856 births
1945 deaths
New Zealand cricketers
Otago cricketers
Cricketers from Melbourne